The Sukhoi Su-17 (izdeliye S-32) is a  variable-sweep wing fighter-bomber developed for the Soviet military. Its NATO reporting name is "Fitter". Developed from the Sukhoi Su-7, the Su-17 was the first variable-sweep wing aircraft to enter Soviet service. Two subsequent Sukhoi aircraft, the Su-20 and Su-22, have usually been regarded as variants of the Su-17. The Su-17/20/22 series has had a long career and has been operated by many other air forces of including the Russian Federation, other former Soviet republics, the former Warsaw Pact, countries in the Arab world, Angola and Peru.

Development

Shortly after the Su-7 fighter-bomber was put into service, the Sukhoi Design Bureau was ordered to develop a deep modernization program for the aircraft in the early 1960s. The program would be aimed primarily at updating on-board avionics and the takeoff/landing performance characteristics. The concept of variable-geometry wings - something gaining wider attention at that time - was adopted as well. The program was to be led by Sukhoi's head designer, Nikolay Zyrin.

Seeking to improve low-speed and take-off/landing performance of the Su-7B fighter-bomber, in 1963 the Sukhoi OKB with input from TsAGI created a variable-sweep wing technology demonstrator. The S-22I (also known as the Su-7IG, NATO designation "Fitter-B"), converted from a production Su-7BM, had fixed inner portions of the wing with movable outer segments which could be swept to 28°, 45°, or 62°. The S-22I first took off, with Vladimir Ilyushin at the controls on 2 August 1966. It was later publicly demonstrated to the public at the air parade in Domodedovo in July 1967. Flight testing revealed that the new configuration improved both the take-off/landing characteristics and the range and endurance of the aircraft. Handling was also generally better than the fixed wing Su-7, with the exception that there was no longer any buffeting at high angles of attack to warn of imminent stall. The aircraft was ordered into serial production in 1969 by a joint resolution of the Central Committee of the Communist Party of the Soviet Union and the Council of Ministers. The design of the Su-7IG was modified further, eventually with enough difference to justify the S-32 internal designation. The S-32 first took off on July 1, 1969, with Yevgeny Kukushev at the controls.

Serial production of the Su-17 started at the Yuri Gagarin Aviation Factory (now KnAAPO) in 1969. The 523rd Aviation Regiment, of the Far East Military Okrug, was the first unit to receive the Su-17. The Su-17 was produced until 1990, at a total of 2867 units produced.

The Su-17 largely resembles its predecessor, the Su-7, with weight-saving measures added at the cost of combat survivability, an example of which is the removal of armored protection for the pilot.

The prototype S-22I differed little from the Su-7 except for the wing, being essentially a technology demonstrator for the variable-geometry wing. It was later lost in an accident.

Following the S-22I, two pre-production prototypes were constructed, designated the S32-1 and the S32-2, respectively. The two aircraft mounted updated avionics, and replaced the older AP-28I-2 autopilot with the newer SAU-22 automatic control system.

The next series of prototypes were the Su-7-85, with 85 indicating the batch number, continued from that of the Su-7. The batch of ten aircraft incorporated a completely redesigned fuselage, a streamlined cockpit (similar to that of the Su-7U), extra and more accessible maintenance hatches, and an upwards-opening canopy. The front of the cockpit was protected with a windshield and two electrically heated side windows. The first three aircraft of the 86th batch that followed further incorporated clear windshields with warm air blown at it, taken from the 9th stage of the engine compressor. However, this new windshield was dropped in favor of the more traditional glazed windshield following tests by the 4th Combat Use and Retraining of Air Force Personnel Center in Lipetsk.

The Su-7-85 was equipped with a modified KS4-S32 ejection seat, capable of safely ejecting the pilot at speeds above 140–170 km/h in the event of an accident.

The fuel system of the Su-17 was modified from that of the Su-7 as well - fuel was now stored in three lightweight tanks, with provisions for up to four disposable auxiliary tanks each with 600 litres of capacity (itself used on the Su-7B), or two PTB-1150 tanks with 1150 litres each, mounted on "wet" pylons underneath the fuselage.

The wing was largely unmodified from that mounted on the S-22I prototype. The stationary part of the wing being half as long as the rotating part. With wings at maximum sweep, the Su-17 would look virtually identical to the Su-7. A slide-out flap was installed on the stationary part of the wing, while a slat, a rotating flap and aileron are mounted on the rotating part. The sweep angle of the wing could be configured between 30° and 63°. The horizontal and vertical tails are swept at 55°.

Flight control was assisted by non-reversing hydraulic boosters, the BU-220DL2 and -220DP2 for the left and right ailerons, the BU-250L and -250P for the stabilizers and the BU-250DRP for the rudder. The flight control systems are spring loaded to provide a feedback force on the stick and the rudder pedals.

There are three independent hydraulic systems installed on the Su-17 - an actuating system and two booster systems, each with its own hydraulic pump. The actuating hydraulic system was responsible for adjusting the sweep angle of the wing, deploying/retracting the landing gear, the flaps and slats, adjusting the intake ramps, the flight control mechanisms used by the SAU-22 autopilot, and the steering front wheel. The booster systems are responsible for controlling the flight surfaces. Both systems operate in parallel to ensure safe operation in the event of one of them failing. The remaining operational system would still provide power to all the flight surfaces, albeit at half the power. The Nr 1 booster system also feeds the GM-40 hydraulic motor driving the rotary parts of the wing. All hydraulic systems are fed with the AMG-10 hydraulic fluid, with a standard operating pressure of 215 kgf/cm2 for the booster systems and 210 for the actuating system.

A pneumatic system with a 150kgf/cm2 pressure operates the normal and emergency brakes on the landing gear as well as the emergency landing gear/flaps deployment system, and was responsible for charging the two NR-30 cannons mounted on the aircraft, pressurizing the cockpit, opening/closing the canopy and pressurizing the hydraulic fluid tanks.

The Su-17 was powered by a modified Lyulka AL-7F1-250 with a slightly uprated thrust of 9600 kgf on afterburners. It was equipped with a compressor actuator with redundancy, and a system for intake adjustment. The aircraft would need to be disassembled into two halves to replace its engine. Jettisonable SPRD-110 RATO boosters are available to facilitate take-off on short runways, providing a momentary thrust of up to 3000 kgf.

On-board electronics are fed by a 28V DC circuit and a 115V, 400 Hz single-phase AC circuit, fed by two GS-12T DC generators, an SGO-8TF AC generator and a 20NKBN25 nickel–cadmium battery.

The Su-17 has the ability to carry free-fall nuclear bombs with a BDZ-56FNM bomb rack. A special code device would also be installed in the cockpit, mandating a correct code input before the bomb could be armed and released, to prevent unauthorized uses of nuclear weaponry. The aircraft also has a toss bombing capability for nuclear weapon delivery, with which it could approach the target, initiate a steep climb and release the bomb when pointing almost upright, and then activate afterburners to escape the blast radius. A special IAB-500 bomb was made specifically for practicing such a bombing technique.

Operational history

Soviet Union/Russia

The Su-17M3/4 were used during the First Chechen War alongside Sukhoi Su-24s and Sukhoi Su-25s in ground attack and reconnaissance missions.

In a move to eliminate single-engine strike aircraft from its inventory, the Russian Air Force retired its last Su-17M4 along with its fleet of MiG-23/27s in 1998.

Angola
The Soviets supplied the communist government of Angola with 12 Su-20Ms in 1982 or 1983, which formed the basis of the 15th FS. The squadron suffered a swift loss of at least six aircraft – most in mishaps – by 1985, and three more by 1988, and had only two aircraft left when it was reinforced with another Soviet batch of 14 Su-22M-4Ks and two Su-22UM-3Ks in 1989–90 (incorporated into the 26th Air Regiment, based in Moçâmedes). A second shipment from Belarus in 1999 consisted of two Su-22UBs and four Su-22Ms, and a third one from Slovakia in 1999–2001 consisted of 10 Su-22M-4s and one Su-22UM-3K.

These aircraft saw heavy use in the war against UNITA. From the aforementioned losses, which can not be classified as mishaps or combat attrition, only an Su-20M, serialled C510 was reportedly downed in 1987 and a better-documented case occurred on 6 November 1994 when an Su-22 based at Catumbela was shot down by a surface-to-air missile launched by UNITA during a raid against Huambo. The pilot managed to eject and flee naked after stripping off his flight suit.

Iraq

From 22 September 1980 to 20 August 1988, during the Iran–Iraq War, Iraq used Su-17 export versions (Su-20 and Su-22) alongside older Su-7s. They were mostly used in ground-attack and close air support roles. Iranian Grumman F-14 Tomcats shot down 21 Su-20/-22s, that have been confirmed by western sources. Eighteen Su-20/-22s were also shot down by Iranian McDonnell Douglas F-4 Phantom IIs. and three by Iranian Northrop F-5s. On 20 October 1980 an Iraqi Su-20 shot down an Iranian F-4E with its 30 mm cannons.

Official Iraqi accounts show no loss of Su-20 aircraft throughout the war against the Kurds and Iran. Twenty Su-22M2s, two Su-22M3s and seven Su-22M4s were lost during the war with Iran, the majority to anti-aircraft fire sustained during low level bombing raids against the Iranian front lines.

In 1991, during the Gulf War, Iraqi Su-22s saw limited active service because the Iraqi regime distrusted the Iraqi Air Force (IQAF). On 7 February 1991, two Su-20/22s and one Su-7 were shot down by United States Air Force McDonnell Douglas F-15 Eagles using AIM-7 air-to-air missiles when the IQAF was moving its aircraft to Iran. Many more were destroyed on the ground by coalition air forces or evacuated to Iran and were never returned.

On 20 and 22 March 1991, two other Su-20/22s were downed by a USAF F-15C during Operation Provide Comfort that started soon after the war.

Libya

Two Libyan Su-22s were shot down in the Gulf of Sidra incident by United States Navy Grumman F-14 Tomcats on 19 August 1981. One Su-22 launched a K-13 missile head-on at one of the F-14s from an estimated 300-meter (984-foot) closing distance, however the missile was evaded. Both were then downed by AIM-9 Sidewinder missiles.

On 8 October 1987, in the aftermath of the Chadian–Libyan conflict, an Su-22 was shot down by a FIM-92A launched by Chadian forces. The pilot, Capt. Diya al-Din, ejected and was captured. He was later granted political asylum by the French government. During the recovery operation, a Libyan Mikoyan-Gurevich MiG-23MS was shot down by a FIM-92A.

A Libyan Su-22 crashed near Benghazi on 23 February 2011. The crew members, Captain Attia Abdel Salem al Abdali and his copilot, Ali Omar Gaddafi, were ordered to bomb the city in response to the Libyan Civil War. They refused, bailing out of the aircraft and parachuting to the ground. Su-22s were heavily used by the Libyan loyalist forces against the insurgent forces from mid February up to mid March 2011, when the international mission started and the no fly zone was imposed. Among other missions, Su-22s also attacked Anti-Gaddafi positions in Bin Jawad in early March 2011 as government forces retook the town.

One Libyan Air Force Su-22 was destroyed on the ground by a Belgian Air Force F-16AM on 27 March.

Peru

Peru was the only export customer of the type in the Americas. In 1980 a Peruvian Su-22 intercepted an alleged UFO over Arequipa.

On 24 April 1992, Peruvian Su-22s attacked a Lockheed C-130H Hercules of the United States Air Force's 310th Airlift Squadron which was intercepted at sea, west of Lima, injuring six of the 14 crew members. Crew member Joseph C. Beard Jr., was killed, when he was blown from the cabin at 18,500 feet, and crew member Ronald Hetzel sustained severe injuries, with his chest blown open and his jugular vein severed. The incident caused an almost year-long interruption to the US anti-drug Air Bridge Denial Program and the establishment of a Joint Air Operation Center at Howard Air Force Base in Panama.

During the 1995 Cenepa War between Peru and Ecuador, two Peruvian Sukhoi Su-22s were lost, when on 10 February, two Ecuadorian Air Force Mirage F1JAs, piloted by Maj. R. Banderas and Capt. C. Uzcátegui, were directed over five targets approaching the disputed Cenepa valley. After making visual contact, the Mirages launched their missiles, claiming two Peruvian Su-22As shot down, while a Kfir claimed a further Cessna A-37 Dragonfly. Peru, however, denied that the two Su-22As were shot down by Mirages, stating that one was struck by Ecuadorian anti-aircraft artillery during a low flying ground-attack mission and the second crashed because of an engine fire.

The Su-22s flew 45 sorties into the combat zone. A 20-strong force of Su-22s was also set up at El Pato as a retaliatory force should Ecuador decide to attack the coastal port.

Poland
On 19 August 2003, a Polish Air Force Su-22M4K was accidentally shot down by friendly fire during an exercise by a Polish 2K12 Kub missile battery. The aircraft was flying 21 km from the coast over the Baltic Sea near Ustka. The pilot ejected and was rescued after two hours in the water. In 2012, Poland was investigating the replacement of its Su-22s with three squadrons of unmanned aerial vehicles.

As of 2014 the Polish Air Force was planning to retain the Su-22s in service. The decision was hoped to have a positive impact on Polish industry, as the WZL nr 2 repair facility in Bydgoszcz would maintain the remaining aircraft under contract to the Air Force. The decision would also allow the Air Force to retain the well-trained ground crews and pilots operating the aircraft. The Poles consider the Su-22 easier to maintain and repair than the other main combat aircraft types currently in Polish service (mainly the MiG-29 and the F-16). They also suffer from fewer malfunctions and other problems (high, 70–75% non-error index). It is also the only aircraft in Polish inventory equipped for electronic intelligence, warfare, and support of ground systems. The Polish Air Force had retained a large stockpile of air-to-ground weapons for use with the Su-22. By some estimates, the cost of destroying these resources would be higher than the projected cost of continuing Su-22 operations.

It was decided that starting from 2015, only 12 Su-22M4s and 4-6 Su-22UM3Ks out of 32 remaining would undergo a refit, increasing their lifespan for another ten years. For economical reasons the aircraft are not modernized, apart from fitting an additional RS-6113-2 C2M radio with a blade antenna on the top, but they receive a new grey multishade camouflage, similar to other Polish aircraft. Several Polish Su-20s and Su-22s have since been donated to various museums, including the Polish Army Museum in Warsaw, the Armament Museum in Poznań, the Museum of Polish Arms in Kołobrzeg and the Polish Aviation Museum in Kraków. Other were placed on monuments or donated to schools as technical aids.

Following the acquisition of 48 KAI T-50 Golden Eagle aircraft from South Korea in 2022, Su-22 will be successively phased out and retired.

Syria
The Syrian Air Force (SyAAF) used Su-20/-22s to attack Israeli forces in the Yom Kippur War and 1982 Lebanon War. Several Su-20/-22s were shot down by the Israeli Air Force. From mid-2012, in the Syrian Civil War, Syrian Air Force Su-22s were involved in combat operations against Syrian insurgents. Videos showed Su-22s using unguided munitions like other SyAAF fixed wing aircraft; mostly general-purpose bombs, cluster bombs and incendiary bombs and unguided rockets. Attack tactics were low to medium-altitude flat bombing runs with pull up after rocketing or bombing, with decoy flares deployed for self-defense. As of the end of 2015, the SyAAF Su-22s suffered a limited number of losses compared to the SyAAF MiG-21 and MiG-23 during the same period. The first confirmed loss of an SyAAF Su-22 was recorded on 14 February 2013, when rebel forces shot it down using a MANPADS. On 18 June 2017, a US F/A-18E Super Hornet engaged and shot down an SyAAF Su-22 for dropping munitions on US-backed forces. According to the wingman of the Super Hornet that made the kill, the Syrian pilot was able to eject and was later returned to the Syrian government. On 24 July 2018, an SyAAF Su-22 which entered Israeli air space was shot down by two Israeli Patriot missiles. Other Syrian Su-22 jets were downed during the ongoing civil war.

Yemen
On 11 August 2009, Yemeni armed forces started Operation Scorched Earth in northern Yemen to fight the Houthis.
The Yemeni Air Force backed the army with air raids on rebel-held positions. On 5 October 2009, a Yemeni Su-22 crashed, with the rebels claiming to have shot it down.
Earlier on 2 October, the Yemeni revolutionaries said they shot down a "MiG-21" while again the military insisted technical problems caused the crash.
On 8 November, a third Yemeni fighter aircraft, reported to be a Sukhoi, was destroyed. Again the military claimed it crashed due to technical problems, while the Yemeni rebels claimed they shot it down. The pilot ejected and was recovered by friendly forces. The Yemeni Air force once again used Sukhoi aircraft during the Arab Spring uprising. On 28 September 2011, a Yemeni Air Force Su-22 was shot down by tribesmen opposed to the rule of President Saleh. The government confirmed that rebels were responsible for the shoot-down, and that the pilot had been captured. On February 19, 2013, a Yemeni Su-22 on a training mission crashed for unknown reasons into Sana'a, killing 12 civilians. On May 13, 2013, another Yemen Su-22 on a training mission crashed in Sana'a, killing the pilot.

Variants

Sources
Su-7IG (S-22I, "Fitter-B")
Su-7BM variable geometry wing demonstrator.
Su-17 (S-32, "Fitter-C")
Initial production aircraft, with a dorsal spine similar to that of the Su-7U (carrying wiring and equipment). Powered by the same Lyulka AL-7F-1 engine as the Su-7. Manufactured between 1969 and 1973, with a total of 224 built.
Su-17M (S-32M, "Fitter-C")
New Lyulka AL-21F-3 engine, new navigation and attack computer. The Su-7BMK's SRD-5M ranging radar is retained. Twin pitot tubes, angle of attack vane, single brake parachute. Variable-position intake centerbody providing maximum speed of Mach 2.1. This version first flew on 28 December 1971 with V. S. Soloviev at the controls. The export version was designated Su-20, and first flew on 15 December 1972 with A. N. Isakov at the controls. The Su-17M was manufactured between 1972 and 1975, and entered service in 1973. The Su-20 was exported to Egypt, Poland, and Syria.
The Su-17M was fitted with a modified fuselage and wing-sweep mechanism (which omitted the driveshafts). The fuel system consisted of a central tank, three interconnected, pressurized follower tanks feeding the central tank, and two additional follower tanks in the non-moving parts of the wing. The Su-17M was also fitted with the new SPO-10 Sirena-ZM radar warning receiver and the ARK-15 Tobol radio compass.
The combat payload for the Su-17M was increased to four tons with the addition of two extra fuselage hardpoints, providing a total of eight BDZ-57M or MT hardpoints for carrying free-fall bombs. MBDZ-U6-68 hardpoints are also available for KMGU submunition containers, S-8 or S-25 rockets. The Su-17M could also carry the Kh-28 anti-radiation missile, which, used in concert with the Metel-A ELINT pod enables the aircraft to engage radar-guided air defence systems.
Su-17M-28
Testbed for Kh-28 (AS-9 Kyle) anti-radiation missile
Su-17MKG
Testbed for Kh-25 and Kh-29 missiles
Su-17R
Small number of Su-17M aircraft equipped to carry reconnaissance pods. Equivalent export version designated Su-20R.
Su-17M2 (S-32M2, "Fitter-D")
Nose extended , with removed ranging radar and 'drooping' to improve pilot visibility. Equipped with the Fon-1400 laser rangefinder/marked-target seeker (LRMTS), ASP-17 and PBK-3-17s aiming avionics, RSBN-6S short-range navigation and instrument landing system. Features an undernose fairing for a DISS-7 Doppler navigation radar. The Su-17M2 first flew on 20 December 1973 with V. S. Ilyushin at the controls. It was manufactured between 1974 and 1977, and it entered service in 1975.
The design of the Su-17M was further modified into what would become the Su-17M2, with three pre-production aircraft used as prototypes. The onboard avionics were improved - the KN-23 navigation system taken from the MiG-23 was installed, with an IKV inertial attitude indicator, a DISS-7 Doppler velocity sensor, air signal systems, and a V-144 analog computer with its own input panel. With the RSBN-6S Romb-K navigation system and the SAU-22M autopilot, the KN-23 provided the capability of automatically navigating along a route defined by three turning points before heading for the target location. The V-144 stored four sets of coordinates for landing airfields, and made it possible for the aircraft to automatically approach the airfield for landing and descend down to an altitude of 50-60 meters prior to manual landing. The SOD-57M transponder was replaced with the newer SO-69. During its service, the SRO-2M transponder was replaced with the newer Parol (Russian for "Password") system. A Fon-1400 laser rangefinder was installed under the inlet cone. The Delta NG missile control system, designed to send command signals to the Kh-23 Grom missile, was integrated into a pod suspended under the wing. The Su-17M2 was fitted with a new ASP-17S gunsight and a PBK-3-17S bombsight. The fuel system also received a nitrogen pressurizer with a 200 kg capacity increase. Starting from aircraft Nr 03909 a central fuel feed system was also introduced with the installation of the ETsN-45 fuel pump. The Su-17M2 was also capable of carrying the Kh-25 air-to-ground missile, fitted with the 24N1 laser seeker. This was first tested by retrofitted Su-7BMs and Su-17Ms, designated Su-17MKG. The Su-17M2 could carry two such missiles, one each under the wing, mounted on an APU-68U or UM rack. The missiles were guided using a Prozhektor-1 laser-designator pod. The Su-17M2 also had an unofficial nickname, s borodoy, which means "with a beard", in Russian.
Su-17M2D
Test-fit of the Tumansky/Khatchaturov R-29BS-300 engine (shared with some MiG-23s), with 112.7 kN (25,335 lbf) afterburning thrust, in a bulged rear fuselage. Due to lack of performance advantage and decreased range due to higher fuel consumption, it was decided to offer this engine for export versions only. This version first flew on 31 January 1975 with A. N. Isakov at the controls. The export variant was designated Su-22 (factory code S-32M2K, NATO "Fitter-F"). It was manufactured between 1977 and 1978.
Su-17UM (S-52U, "Fitter-E")
First two-seat trainer version, based on the Su-17M2, but with a different, deeper fuselage with its windscreen moved forward; same length as the original Su-17M. The internal fuel capacity was reduced and the port cannon deleted, but the aircraft retained full avionics and armament. The Su-17UM first flew on 15 August 1975 with V. A. Krechetov at the controls. Test flights revealed longitudinal instability at high angles of attack which was remedied by enlarging the tail fin. The export version with the R-29 engine was designated Su-22U. The Su-17UM was manufactured between 1976 and 1978, and entered service in 1976.
Su-17M3 (S-52, "Fitter-H")
Based on the revised airframe of the Su-17UM, but with an avionics bay and an additional fuel tank in place of the rear cockpit, increasing the internal fuel capacity to 4850 l (1,280 U.S. gal). The Doppler radar was moved internally, and the fairing was thus removed. The Su-17M3 was equipped with the "Klen-P" laser rangefinder/target designator. A launch rail for Vympel K-13 or Molniya R-60 air-to-air missiles was added between the two existing pylons on each wing. The Su-17M3 first flew on 30 June 1976 with V. A. Krechetov at the controls. Its export version with the R-29 engine and downgraded avionics (equivalent to those of the Su-17M2) was designated Su-22M (factory designation S-52K, NATO "Fitter-J") and first flew on 24 May 1977 with E. S. Soloviev at the controls. An export version with Su-17M3 avionics was designated Su-22M3 (factory S-52MK). The Su-17 was manufactured from 1976 to 1981, and the Su-22M from 1978 to 1984. The Su-17M3 and its export versions represented the most numerous variant, with almost 1,000 built.
The Su-17M3 was planned at the same time as the UM trainer. The fuel capacity was increased by 260kg. Starting from the 38th batch the tailfin was raised with a radiotransparent guide and a fin was added on the underside of the tail to improve high-speed stability. A new KN-23-1 navigation system, the SAU-22M1 autopilot and the RV-15 (A-031) radio altimeter were added. Some aircraft later received an RSDN-10 Skip-2 (A-720) long-range radio navigation system, with its antenna installed on the leading edge of the tailfin. The SARPP-12GM flight recorder was replaced with the newer Tester-UZ recorder, and the SPO-10 radar warning receiver was replaced with the SPO-15A (izdeliye L006L) Beryoza. A Klyon-PS combined laser rangefinder/designator was installed, alongside the ASP-17BTs sight. The Su-17M3 could carry an SPS-141 (or the 142-143) Siren or an SPS-141MVG Gvozdika ECM pod. Infrared countermeasures could be deployed via KDS-23 launchers. The BSPPU fire-control system was also installed in the Su-17M3, which would control SPPU-22-01 gun pods suspended on the wings to automatically stay on target in automatic tracking mode, up to a depression angle of 30°. Two additional hardpoints were placed under the fuselage, with S-52-8812-300 pylons, on which BDZ-57MT or MTA racks would hold APU-68UMs, which in turn could carry Kh-23M or Kh-25 missiles. These hardpoints would also be capable of carrying the Kh-25ML or MR missiles, as well as the Kh-29L, mounted on an AKU-58 ejector rack. Some of the Su-17M3s were modified to the Su-17M3P standard, which would enable them to carry up to four Kh-27PS, two on the wings and two under the fuselage, or two Kh-58 anti-radiation missiles, which could only be carried on the fuselage pylons. A Vyuga-17 (L-086) target designator pod could be installed under the fuselage, with its receiver integrated into the aircraft's nose. The BDZ-57MT racks could also hold ordinary ordnance, such as the UB-16, -32 or the B-13L rocket pods, free-fall bombs, KMGU submunition containers, and the SPPU-22-01 gun pods. In a somewhat unconventional manner, the S-52-8307-200 pylons could be mounted on the aircraft, on which the gun pods would be installed in a rearwards-facing manner, pointed downwards at 23°, and fired as the aircraft flew away from ground targets. The first Su-17M3s were unpainted with the silver color from the anodized duralumin. Later Su-17M3s, as well as all variants that followed, was painted with a green camouflage pattern on the top, and blue on the bottom. This camouflage pattern eventually found its way to all Su-17s in service, and the paint jobs were done at repair plants. The camouflage pattern - the locations of the paint dots - was not standardized, thus each aircraft had its own "unique" camouflage. The Su-17M3 would also have a trainer variant designated the Su-17UM3 (see below).
Su-17UM (S-52UM)
Initial trainer version with the same avionics suite as the Su-17M. The export version was designated Su-22UM3 with R-29 engine, and Su-22UM3K with the AL-21 engine. Manufactured from 1978 to 1982.
Su-17UM3 (S-52UM3, "Fitter-G")
Revised trainer with the same avionics suite as the Su-17M3. The Su-17UM3 first flew on 21 September 1978 with Yu. A. Yegorov at the controls. The export version was designated Su-22UM3 with R-29 engine, and Su-22UM3K with the AL-21 engine. It was manufactured between 1978 and 1982.

Su-17M4 (S-54, "Fitter-K")
Final production version with considerably upgraded avionics, including RSDN navigation (similar to LORAN), beacon navigation, inertial navigation, radio compass, and SPO-15LE radar warning receiver. It featured additional fuselage inlets (including a ram-air inlet at the base of the fin) to improve engine cooling airflow, and a fixed air intake shock cone. Many aircraft were equipped for the use of TV-guided missiles and BA-58 Vjuga pod for anti-radiation missiles. The Su-17M4 was equipped with the AL-21F-3 engine, and its export version was designated Su-22M4 (factory S-54K). The Su-17M4 first flew on 19 June 1980 with Yu. A. Yegorov at the controls. The Su-17M4 was manufactured from 1981 to 1988, and the Su-22M4 from 1983 to 1990.
The Su-17M4 differed from the Su-17M3 in the removal of the inlet cone control system, which restricted the maximum allowable flight speed to Mach 1.75. The inlet cone housed the more powerful Klyon-54 laser rangefinder. The avionics again differed significantly from the Su-17M4's predecessors - a new A-312 Radikal NP close- and A-720 Skip-2 long-range navigation systems, an ARK-22 radio compass, an MRP-66 radio beacon receiver, an RV-21 Impuls (A-035) radio altimeter, and the DISS-7 Doppler velocity sensor, air signal systems, the IKV-8 inertial attitude indicator inherited from the Su-17M2. The Vyuga target designator pod could be carried in a BA-58 pod under the fuselage, which would enable the use of the Kh-27PS and Kh-58U or E missiles. Some Su-17M4s were fitted with the IT-23M indicator, which would transmit video from the Tubus-2 seeker on the Kh-29T missile to facilitate target acquisition.

Su-17M5 (S-56)
Proposed upgraded variant with a new fixed wing based on the swing wing at 45 degrees sweep, new avionics, and an AL-31F turbofan. Not built.

Su-20
The initial export version of the Su-17M (S-32MK).
Su-22M5
A Russian-French upgrade package offered for existing aircraft with modernized cockpit, HOTAS, improved avionic systems, and laser rangefinder replaced by Phazotron/Thomson-CSF radar.
Su-22U
The S-52U two-seat combat-trainer, export version of the Su-17UM, with a completely re-designed nose housing the tandem cockpits for student and instructor.
Gun pods such as the GSh-23 based UPK-23 and SPPU-22 were utilized by the Su-17, Su-20, and Su-22. The SPPU-22 ground attack variant featured 30 degrees of traverse.

An experimental version of the Su-20 was built with fixed wings attached to an Su-17M fuselage, in an effort to increase Payload/range performance by eliminating the weight of the wing sweep system. Good results were obtained in flight tests in 1973 but further development was cancelled.

Tactical Reconnaissance versions of all variants could be made by fitting the KKR (Kombinirovannyi Konteiner Razvedky – combined reconnaissance pod) on the centre-line hardpoint.

In-house OKB designations

S-22I
The first prototype "Variable-Geometry" Su-7, converted from a production Su-7BM, first flown on 2 August 1966.
S-32
 The initial production version, dubbed Su-17 by the VVS – Soviet Air Forces.
S-32M
The Su-17 with the Lyul'ka AL-21F engine and re-structured fuselage plus several smaller modifications, resulting in a greater fuel capacity and more weapons stations.
S-32MK
The Su-20 export version with revised armament options, and less sophisticated avionics. First flight: 15 December 1972.
S-32MK Hybrid
Single aircraft (f/n 9500) built with fuselage of S-32MK and fixed wings of Su-7BMK. Offered to customers as cheaper/less complex alternative to Su-20, but no production.
S-32M2
The Su-17M with improved flying controls and weapon-aiming equipment. Production carried out from 1975 to 1977
S-32M2K
The Su-22 export version of the Su-17M2 with a Tumansky R-29BS-300 engine.
S-32M2D
An Su-17 tested with ski landing gear, similar to that used on the S-26 (Su-7), used for [very] rough field landing and takeoff tests.
Su-52U
The Su-17UM/Su-22U two-seat combat-trainer version with a completely re-designed nose housing the tandem cockpits for student and instructor.
S-52
In a reverse development the trainer modifications were adapted for a new Attack variant, the Su-17M3.
S-52K
An export variant of the S-52, given the designation Su-22M.
S-52M3K
Series production Su-22M3 aircraft with laser range-finder and avionics mods.
S-52UK
The trainer variant with all the S-32M2K structural modifications and a reduced weapons portfolio.
S-52UM3
The Su-17UM3 for the VVS with avionics and aero-dynamic changes.
S-52UM3K
The export version of the Su-17UM3.
S-52R
Tactical Reconnaissance Su-17M3R with a KKR (Kombinirovanny Konteiner Razvedy – combined reconnaissance pod) on the centre-line pylon
 S-54
Production Su-17M4 fighter-bombers.
S-54K
Export Su-17M4s, designated Su-22M4.
S-54R
Tactical reconnaissance Su-17M4R with a KKR (Kombinirovanny Konteiner Razvedy – combined reconnaissance pod) on the centre-line pylon.

Operators

  The People's Air and Air Defence Force of Angola operates 14 Su-22 variants.
  the Aerospace Force of the Islamic Revolutionary Guard Corps (IRGC-AF) operates the Iranian Su-22 fleet and not the regular military. The IRGC aircraft have military identification numbers that are prefixed '15-'  Iran received 40 Su-20/22s from Iraq in 1991. While non-operational for several years, in 2013 Iran started an overhaul program. In March 2015, it seems that some of the IRGC-AF Su-22s were transferred to the Syrian Arab Air Force to fight in the ongoing Civil War. Iran currently possesses 30 operational Su-22s. In July 2018 Iranian military technical experts successfully overhauled and modernized 10 Su-22s, giving them the ability to carry smart bombs, fire precision-guided munitions, transfer data from UAVs, and in the near future the system necessary to utilize air-launched cruise missiles with a range of 1500 km will be installed on them.
  The Libyan Air Force operated as many as 90 Su-22 aircraft, with around 40 Su-22M3 and Su-22UM3K aircraft in service at the beginning of 2011 when the Libyan uprising started. During the Libyan Civil War, the Gaddafi regime used Su-22s in combat operations. As of 2017, two Su-22s remained in service.
  The Polish Air Force currently operates 12 Su-22M4 and 6 Su-22UM3K aircraft of 120 delivered. Other airframes have been preserved in warehouses. Poland operated 27 Su-20s from 1974 until the 1990s.
  28 Su-22 aircraft served with the Syrian Air Force prior to the Syrian Civil War.
  Three regiments of Su-22UM3K and Su-22M4 aircraft served with the Vietnam People's Air Force.
  The Yemeni Air Force inherited Su-22s from both North and South Yemen, following the 1994 civil war. In 1996, all of the remaining Su-22s and Su-22Ms were retired. At least four Su-17M4s were bought second-hand from Ukraine around 1994. 18 aircraft were still operational in 2011. Most Yemeni Air Force combat aircraft, including Su-22s, were destroyed in bombardments of their bases during the first days of the Saudi Arabian-led intervention in Yemen.

Former operators

  the Soviet Union sent more than 70 aircraft to the Democratic Republic of Afghanistan for service with the Afghan Air Force. These included 45 Su-22M4s delivered from 1984.
 
  Azerbaijan Air Force
  Belarus Air Force. The Belarusian Air Force inherited Su-17s from the Soviet Air Force, but none remain in service.
  Bulgarian Air Force. The Bulgarian Air Force operated 18 Su-22M4 and five Su-22UM aircraft. All are retired.

  Czechoslovak Air Force. The Czechoslovak Air Force's Su-22 inventory (49 Su-22M4s and 8 Su-22UM3Ks in 1992) was split between the Czech Republic and Slovakia in 1993.
  Czech Air Force. The Czech Air Force inherited 31 Su-22M4s and five Su-22UM3Ks. All were retired in 2002.
  Air Forces of the National People's Army. East Germany operated 48 Su-22M4s and 8 Su-22UM-3Ks until unification, when they were passed on to the Luftwaffe.
 Volksmarine. The East German Navy operated eight Su-22M-4Ks and two Su-22UM-3K aircraft.
  Egyptian Air Force. The Egyptian Air Force operated 48 Su-20/22 aircraft, although all have been withdrawn, being replaced by the F-4 Phantom II and General Dynamics F-16 Fighting Falcon in their role.
  Luftwaffe. A number of Su-22 aircraft were inherited from East Germany, although these did not serve in the Luftwaffe, but some of them were painted with a Luftwaffe color scheme for test and evaluation. All of them have been decommissioned.
 German Navy. Ex-Volksmarine aircraft.

  Hungarian Air Force. The Hungarian Air Force maintained 12 Su-22M3 and three Su-22UM3 aircraft from 1983. Two single seat and one training aircraft crashed. Withdrawn from service in 1997.
  Iraqi Air Force. The Iraqi Air Force received a large number of Su-22 models, of which 40 were impounded by Iran after having escaped the coalition air campaign in 1991. None survived the 2003 invasion of Iraq by the United States.
 No. 1 Squadron IqAF - "as of September 1980, the Iraqi air force’s No. 1 Squadron was still equipped with 16 out of 18 Sukhoi Su-20s Iraq acquired in 1973."
 No. 44 Squadron IqAF - flying Su-20/22s in September 1980.
  Su-17 aircraft were inherited by the Armed Forces of the Republic of Kazakhstan, but never put into service.
  Yemen Arab Republic Air Force. In November 1979, North Yemeni president Ali Abdullah Saleh concluded an arms deal with the USSR, including 14 Su-22Ms. 14 additional Su-22s were ordered in the 1980s. A few Su-22M3s were also delivered, only weeks before the beginning of the 1994 civil war.

  Peruvian Air Force. The Peruvian Air Force acquired 32 Sukhoi Su-22A, 4 Su-22U, 16 Su-22M and 3 Su-22UM aircraft between 1977 and 1980. Retired in 2006, 11 remain in reserve status.
  Russian Air Force. The Russian Air Force inherited Soviet Su-17 aircraft, but has withdrawn the type from service. At least one example remains flying as a chase plane operated by Sukhoi at its KnAAPO facility.
 Russian Naval Aviation

  Slovak Air Force. The Slovak Air and Air Defense Forces inherited 18 Su-22M4 and three Su-22UM3K aircraft from Czechoslovakia in 1993. In 1999, six Su-22M4 and in 2001, four Su-22M4 and one Su-22UM3K aircraft were sold to Angola while the rest of the fleet was grounded and is being used as museum exhibits and as teaching aids in flight schools.
  People's Democratic Republic of Yemen Air Force. First 12 Su-22s received around 1976. In addition, 40 Su-22Ms, Su-22M3s and Su-22UM3Ks were received between 1982 and 1986. Lastly, 12 to 14 Su-22M4Ks were delivered, probably around 1989.
  a number of Su-17 aircraft were inherited by the Military of Turkmenistan after the breakup of the Soviet Union, but they were never put into service
  Ukrainian Air Force. Approximately 50 Su-17M3, MR4 and UM3 aircraft were inherited from the Soviet Union. All of them were retired from active service by 2004. Some aircraft were scrapped and others put in storage. In 2005–2007, 24 S-17M4R/MU3s underwent overhaul and were sold to Yemen and Vietnam. Remaining 13 aircraft in storage located at Shkilnii Airfield, Odesa and the airfield of the Zoporizhian aircraft repair plant. As of 2016, a single Su-17UM3 was operated by the plant to keep flying skills of its pilots and to test equipment.
  The Soviet Union's Su-17s were split between post-USSR countries
 Soviet Air Force
 Soviet Naval Aviation
  A number of Su-17 aircraft were inherited by the Military of Uzbekistan, now all are retired and stored at Chirchiq.

Specifications (Su-17M4)

See also

References

Notes

Bibliography

 
 
 
 Cooper, Tom and Farzad Bishop. Iranian F-14 Tomcat Units in Combat. Oxford, UK: Osprey Publishing, 2004. .
 
 Green, William and F. Gordon Swanborough. The Great book of Fighters. St. Paul, Minnesota: MBI Publishing, 2001. .
 Wilson, Stewart. Combat Aircraft since 1945. Fyshwick, Australia: Aerospace Publications, 2000. .

External links

 from FAS
 List of all Su-17 (Su-20 and Su-22) fighters used by Polish Air Force
 from Russian Military Analysis
 Su-22M4 in panoramic view
 Su-22 Fitter in high-quality photos

Su-17
1960s Soviet attack aircraft
Variable-sweep-wing aircraft
Single-engined jet aircraft
Mid-wing aircraft
Aircraft first flown in 1966